"I Couldn't Leave You If I Tried" is a song written and recorded by American country music artist Rodney Crowell.  It was released in May 1988 as the second single from Crowell's album Diamonds & Dirt.  the song was the second of Crowell's five number one country singles.  The single went to number one for one week and spent a total of 13 weeks on the country chart.

Charts

Weekly charts

Year-end charts

References

1988 singles
1988 songs
Rodney Crowell songs
Songs written by Rodney Crowell
Song recordings produced by Tony Brown (record producer)
Columbia Records singles
Song recordings produced by Rodney Crowell